Multicoloured Shades is a remix album by Penal Colony, released on February 13, 1995 by Zoth Ommog Records.

Reception

AllMusic awarded Multicoloured Shades two out of five possible stars.

Track listing

Personnel 
Adapted from the Multicoloured Shades liner notes.

Penal Colony
 Jason Hubbard – sampler, programming, drum programming
 Dee Madden – lead vocals, sampler, programming, design, remixing (12)
 Andy Shaw – electric guitar, backing vocals
 Chris Shinkus – bass guitar, backing vocals, design

Additional musicians
 Rhys Fulber – remixing (2–4, 9)
 Matt Green – remixing (5)
 Bill Leeb – remixing (2–4, 9)
 Claus Larsen – remixing (1)
 Genesis P-Orridge – remixing (11)
 Shawn Rudiman – remixing (10)
 Larry Thrasher – remixing (11)
 Ed Vargo – remixing (10)

Release history

References

External links 
 

1995 remix albums
Penal Colony albums
Zoth Ommog Records albums